The 2015 Men's under-19 World Floorball Championships were the eighth world championships in men's under-19 floorball. The tournament took place over April 29 to May 3, 2015, in Helsingborg, Sweden.

Finland won their 3rd world championship total by winning Switzerland in the final with goals 13–3. Host team Sweden ended to 4th place when Czechia won them with goals 7–6 in the bronze medal game on the overtime. This is the first and the only time when Sweden ended the international floorball tournament without medal.

Championship results

Preliminary round

Group A

Group B

Placement round

7th Place match

5th Place match

Final round

Semifinals

Bronze Medal match

Final

Final standings 

Norway was relegated to the B-Division for the 2017 Men's under-19 World Floorball Championships.

See also
 2015 Men's under-19 World Floorball Championships B-Division

External links
 Official Website

under-19
Mens Under-19 World Floorball Championships, 2015
Floorball
Sports competitions in Helsingborg
2015 in Swedish sport